Stipa tirsa is a species of perennial grass native to Europe and temperate Asia. Culms are 40–100 cm long; leaf blades are filiform, involute, and 1–2 mm wide.

Synonyms
 Stipa stenophylla (Czern. ex Lindem.) Trautv.

References and external links

 GrassBase - The Online World Grass Flora
 GBIF entry
 USDA Plants Profile entry

tirsa
Flora of Europe
Bunchgrasses of Europe